Find Me is a 2019 novel by writer André Aciman. The novel follows the lives of Samuel "Sami" Perlman, his son Elio Perlman, and Oliver, characters established in Aciman's 2007 novel Call Me By Your Name.

Summary
The novel is split into four sections: Tempo, Cadenza, Capriccio, and Da Capo. Each of the sections focuses on a different character's point of view, and this is not stated explicitly. The sections vary in length, with Tempo being the longest at almost half the book and Da Capo the shortest.

Tempo:
Ten years after the events of Call Me By Your Name, Sami Perlman meets a younger woman named Miranda while traveling by train to Rome. The two quickly grow close, and strike up a romantic relationship. While in Rome, the couple visit Miranda's ailing father, attend a public lecture held by Sami, and meet with Elio.

Cadenza: Fifteen years later, Elio works as a piano teacher in Paris. At a concert he meets an older man named Michel, and they begin a romantic relationship. They visit Michel's childhood home in the French countryside, and end their relationship amicably several weeks later.

Capriccio:
Several years later, Oliver works as a professor at a college in New Hampshire. He is married with children, but harbors nostalgia for the time he spent with Elio as a college student. He reunites with Elio in Italy, and they reconnect romantically. Though Sami has died, he fathered a child with Miranda, whom they named Oliver.

Da Capo:
Elio and Oliver are together again, raising Little Ollie, Elio's half brother.

Background
On December 6, 2017, when asked about a proposed sequel to the film adaptation of Call Me by Your Name, Aciman replied that "the problem with a sequel is that you need plot." On December 3, 2018, Aciman announced on his Twitter account that he was writing a sequel to Call Me by Your Name. The novel's title and release date were officially confirmed on March 20, 2019.

Release
The novel was published by Farrar, Straus and Giroux on October 29, 2019. The audiobook is read by actor Michael Stuhlbarg, who portrayed Elio's father, Sami Perlman, in the film adaptation of Call Me by Your Name.

Ahead of its release, on October 11, 2019, Vanity Fair published an exclusive excerpt from the novel, along with two illustrations by Jenny Kroik.

Critical reception
Find Me was met with mixed reviews from literary critics, with review aggregator Book Marks reporting five negative and six mixed reviews among 26 total.

References

2019 American novels
Novels set in Italy
Novels set in New England
Call Me by Your Name
Sequel novels
Farrar, Straus and Giroux books
2010s LGBT novels
2019 LGBT-related literary works